John Jay (1745–1829), was an American politician, statesman, revolutionary, diplomat, and the first Chief Justice of the United States.

John Jay may also refer to:

People
John Clarkson Jay (1808–1891), physician and grandson of John Jay, the American Founding Father and statesman
John Jay (lawyer) (1817–1894), American diplomat and lawyer, grandson of John Jay, the American Founding Father and statesman
John Jay (builder) (1805–1888), British stonemason and builder in the nineteenth century
John Jay (filmmaker) (1915–2000), American ski filmmaker
Jon Jay (born 1985), American baseball player

Places
John Jay College of Criminal Justice, part of the City University of New York
John Jay Hall, part of Columbia University
John Jay High School (disambiguation)
John Jay Middle School

Other
John Jay Report, another name for the 2004 report titled The Nature and Scope of the Problem of Sexual Abuse of Minors by Catholic Priests and Deacons in the United States

See also

Jay John, American basketball coach